Route 110 is a  southwest–northeast state route in the U.S. state of  Massachusetts. Route 110’s western terminus is at a concurrency of Route 12 and Route 140 in West Boylston, and its eastern terminus is at the junction of U.S. 1 and Route 1A in Sailsbury, a few miles from the Atlantic Ocean. Route 110 provides an alternate route for the northern part (section after Route 2) of I-495.

Route description
Route 110 begins at Route 12 in West Boylston, just north of the Wachusett Reservoir and the border with Worcester. The route follows north of the reservoir, passing through Sterling before entering Clinton. In Clinton, Route 110 shares a quarter-mile concurrency with Route 62 and Route 70 before heading northward, crossing the Nashua River and passing through Lancaster.

The route continues into Bolton, crossing Route 117 and passing the Bolton Flats before entering the town of Harvard.  Route 110 continues through the village of Still River, wrapping around Bare Hill Pond before joining Route 111, starting a 3.7-mile long concurrency which crosses Route 2 at Exit 109 (formerly 38), just east of Fort Devens.  The concurrency with Route 111 ends in Ayer in Middlesex County at a rotary junction with Route 2A, where Route 110 begins a concurrency with Route 2A eastward into Littleton.

In Littleton, Routes 110 and 2A cross the Fitchburg Line railroad tracks before meeting I-495 at Exit 79 (formerly 30), beginning Route 110's long relationship with the interstate.  At Route 119. Route 2A leaves Route 110 to head eastward, with Route 110 entering Westford.  In Westford, Route 110 shares a short concurrency with Route 225 before continuing just south of I-495, accessing the highway again off of Boston Road.  Route 110 enters Chelmsford, meeting Massachusetts Route 4 and the western end of Route 129 at the center of town, just north of the northern end of Route 27.  Route 110 then crosses I-495 at Exit 88 (formerly 34), and then shortly meets U.S. Route 3 at Exit 81C (formerly 31), just as Route 110 enters the city of Lowell.

In Lowell, Route 110 joins Route 3A near the Gallagher Transit Center and just north of the northern end of the Lowell Connector.  Route 110 continues eastward, meeting the western end of Route 133 at Route 38, joining Route 38 to head northward across the Merrimack River via the Hunts Falls Bridge.  Just north of the bridge the two routes split at a rotary, with Route 38 heading west and Route 110 heading east, following the northern bank of the Merrimack on a two-lane road through Dracut and into Methuen.  Up until approximately 1997, the Methuen section was a four-lane road; its total length as a four-lane road was the same as the modern two-lane road is. The change to being a two-lane road thus was most likely due to safety.

In Methuen, Route 110 meets Route 113 at an interchange with Interstate 93 at Exit 43 (formerly 46), splitting from Route 113 quickly, with Route 110 heading eastward into the city of Lawrence.  Route 110 crosses Route 28 before heading along the north side of Campagnone Common before turning northward along Jackson Street.  It then heads back into Methuen and turns eastward again along Swan Street, heading towards another junction with I-495 at Exit 104 (formerly 46).  The route then junctions Route 113 again before crossing under I-495 without junction before entering Haverhill.

In Haverhill, Routes 110 and 113 bend around the Merrimack, meeting I-495 again at Exit 107 (formerly 49). The routes follow the banks of the Merrimack until Route 110 turns northward along Emerson Street. It crosses Route 97 before having a brief concurrency with Route 125, turning northward. The route passes Winnekenni Park and Kenoza Lake at the junction with Route 108 before crossing I-495 again at Exit 111 (formerly 52). Route 110 then heads into Merrimac, acting as the main street through that town before entering Amesbury. In Amesbury, Route 110 junctions Route 150 and I-495 at its last exit (Exit 119; formerly 55) before crossing I-95 at exit 88 (formerly 58) and entering Salisbury. Between these two interstates, Route 110 carries the traffic from one to the other as there is no direct access from 495 north to 95 south or 95 north to 495 south.

Major intersections

Massachusetts Route 110A

Route 110A was a short north–south state highway running from Amesbury to Salisbury. Its only record is a 1936 map of the area.

See also

References

External links

110
Transportation in Essex County, Massachusetts
Transportation in Middlesex County, Massachusetts
Transportation in Worcester County, Massachusetts